Irene Handl (27 December 1901 – 29 November 1987) was a British author and character actress who appeared in more than 100 British films.

Life
Irene Handl was born in Maida Vale, London, the younger of two daughters of an Austria-born father -- who came to England via Switzerland and started as a bank clerk working his way up into the stock exchange as a stockbroker, then became a private banker -- Friedrich (later Frederick) 
Handl (1874–1961), who became a naturalised British subject. Her German mother, Marie ( Schiepp or Schuepp; 1875–before 1924), was also a naturalised British subject. Theirs was a comfortable middle-class life, with a German cook and housekeeper living in the family home. 

From 1907 to 1915, Irene attended the Paddington and Maida Vale High School. In the 1920s, Handl travelled several times to New York with her father, with the ship's log listing her on each occasion as having no occupation and residing in the family home. 

Handl studied at an acting school run by a sister of Dame Sybil Thorndike, and then made her stage debut in London in February 1937, at the relatively advanced age of 36. Among her many later appearances on stage, she played Lady Bracknell in The Importance of Being Earnest in 1975, in a production directed by Jonathan Miller. 

In 1939, and by now an actress, she was living with her widower father in London. She continued to live with her father until his death in 1961. It was common at this time for younger daughters not to marry in order to stay with and take care of their widower fathers. Her older sister Liane (1898 – 1977) had married Russian electrical engineer and photographer Victor Kraminsky (born Viktor Azar'evich Kraminskii; later known as Victor Kennett; 1894-1980) in 1920 in Marylebone, Middlesex (now London). They had at least one child, a son, Charles Kennett.

She appeared in supporting roles in more than 100 British films, mostly comedy character parts such as slightly eccentric mothers, grannies, landladies and servants. She was a passionate lover of rock and roll, especially the work of Elvis Presley, and was president of the Lewisham branch of the Elvis Presley fan club. She was also a fellow of the Royal Geographical Society, and one of Britain's most avid champions of Chihuahuas, being inseparable from the pair that she owned.

Career

Films
Handl had minor roles in such landmark films as Night Train to Munich and Brief Encounter. Her other notable roles included the wife of the union activist Fred Kite (played by Peter Sellers) in I'm All Right Jack (1959); Mrs Gammon, the formidable cook, opposite Gordon Harker in Small Hotel (1957); Tony Hancock's landlady in The Rebel (1961); Sherlock Holmes's housekeeper, Mrs Hudson, in The Private Life of Sherlock Holmes (1970); and Morgan's Communist mother, Mrs Delt, in Morgan – A Suitable Case for Treatment  (1966). She also had small roles in two of the  Carry On films, Carry On Nurse and Carry On Constable), and played Miss Peach in the original version of The Italian Job. She worked until 1987, the year of her death. Her last role was released posthumously the following year.

Theatre
Goodnight Mrs Puffin
Move Over Mrs Markham
 Cry Liberty 
The Importance of Being Earnest

Television

On television, she appeared as a guest in a number of comedy series, notably as a regular in Educating Archie and as the Cockney widow Ada Cresswell in For the Love of Ada, which was later adapted for the cinema. In 1969 she starred in the series World in Ferment as Madame Astoria. She also appeared in Maggie and Her (1978) opposite Julia McKenzie. In the early 1980s, she played Gran in the ITV children's comedy show Metal Mickey. She appeared in a rare aristocratic role as the Duchess of Sheffield in Mapp and Lucia and as another aristocratic character in Eric Sykes's television film It's Your Move (1982), in which her chauffeur was played by Brian Murphy. She also appeared as Madame de Bonneuil in the BBC's TV film Hotel du Lac in 1986. She appeared in Super Gran as the magician The Great Ronaldo and as Tim Wylton's mother in Clinging Ivy (1985). Her last appearance was in the BBC sitcom In Sickness and in Health in 1987, just before her death at the age of 85.

Novels
In addition to acting, she wrote two novels: The Sioux (1965), described by Margaret Drabble as "strange and unforgettable ... Highly original and oddly haunting"; and its sequel, The Gold Tip Pfitzer, (a type of Juniper, associated with mourning), (1966). The Sioux was reprinted as Green and Purple Dream (1973). She began writing what became The Sioux when she was living in Paris at the age of 19, put it aside, and did not start to write again until 1961.

Death
Handl died in her flat in Kensington, West London, on 29 November 1987, aged 85, reportedly from cancer. She never married. She was cremated at Golders Green Crematorium, North London.

Selected filmography

Missing, Believed Married (1937) as Chambermaid
Strange Boarders (1938) as Mrs Dewar
The Terror (1938) as Kitchen Maid (uncredited)
Inspector Hornleigh on Holiday (1939) as Boarder (uncredited)
On the Night of the Fire (1939) as Kitchen Maid (uncredited)
Mrs. Pym of Scotland Yard (1940) as the Medium
Dr. O'Dowd (1940) as Sarah
The Girl in the News (1940) as Gertrude Mary Blaker
Night Train to Munich (1940) as Station Master (uncredited)
George and Margaret (1940) as Beer
Mr. Proudfoot Shows a Light (1941) as Councillor
Gasbags (1941) as Burgomaster's wife
Spellbound (1941) as Mrs Nugent
"Pimpernel" Smith (1941) in an uncredited bit part
Uncensored (1942) as Frau von Koerner
Get Cracking (1943) as Maggie Turner (uncredited)
I'll Walk Beside You (1943) as Ma Perkins
The Flemish Farm (1943) as Frau
Dear Octopus (1943) as Flora
Millions Like Us (1943) as Landlady (uncredited)
 Rhythm Serenade (1943) as Mrs Crumbling
It's in the Bag (1944) as Mrs Beam
Welcome, Mr. Washington (1944) as Mrs Pidgeon (uncredited)
English Without Tears (1944) (uncredited)
Give Us the Moon (1944) as Miss Haddock
Mr. Emmanuel (1944) as Trude
Medal for the General (1944) as Mrs Farnsworth
One Exciting Night (1944)
Kiss the Bride Goodbye (1945) as Mrs Victory
For You Alone (1945) as Miss Trotter
Great Day (1945) as Lady serving tea at a tea stall
Brief Encounter (1945) as cellist and organist (uncredited)
 I'll Turn to You (1946) as Mrs Gammon
Temptation Harbour (1947) as Mrs Gowshall
Code of Scotland Yard (1947) as Ruby Towser
The Hills of Donegal (1947) as Mrs Mactavish
Woman Hater (1948) as Mrs Fletcher
The Fool and the Princess (1949) as Lady on left
Silent Dust (1949) as Cook
The History of Mr Polly (1949) as Lady on left
Cardboard Cavalier (1949) as Lady Agnes
For Them That Trespass (1949) as Inn Proprietress
The Perfect Woman (1949) as Mrs Butters
 Dark Secret (1949) as "Woody" Woodman
Adam and Evelyne (1949) as Mrs Crouch – Manageress (uncredited)
Stage Fright (1950) as Mrs Mason – Gill's Maid (uncredited)
One Wild Oat (1951) as Emily Pepys (Audrey Cuttle #2)
Young Wives' Tale (1951) as Nanny
Treasure Hunt (1952) as Nanny
Top Secret (1952) as Mrs Tidmarsh
Meet Mr. Lucifer (1953) as Lady with the Dog
The Wedding of Lilli Marlene (1953) as Daisy
Stryker of the Yard (1953)
The Weak and the Wicked (1954) as Waitress
Duel in the Jungle (1954) as Mary Taylor (uncredited)
The Belles of St. Trinian's (1954) as Miss Gale
Mad About Men (1954) as Mme Blanche
Burnt Evidence (1954) as Mrs Raymond
A Kid for Two Farthings (1955) as Mrs Abramowitz
Now and Forever (1956) as Middle-Aged Woman (uncredited)
Who Done It? (1956) as Customer (uncredited)
It's Never Too Late (1956) as New Neighbour
The Silken Affair (1956) as Receptionist
Brothers in Law (1957) as Mrs Potter
Small Hotel (1957) as Mrs Gammon
Happy Is the Bride (1957) as Mme Edna
Law and Disorder (1958) as Woman
The Key (1958) as Clerk
Dial 999 (TV series), ('The Big Fish', episode) - (1958) as Mrs. Rigby (uncredited)
Next to No Time (1958) as Mrs Crowley, Greengrocer
Carlton-Browne of the F.O. (1959) as Mrs Carter
Carry On Nurse (1959) as Mrs Madge Hickson
The Crowning Touch (1959) as Bebe
Left Right and Centre (1959) as Mrs Maggs
I'm All Right Jack (1959) as Mrs Kite
The Night We Dropped a Clanger (1959) as Mrs Billingsgate
Upstairs and Downstairs (1959) as Large Woman
Desert Mice (1959) as Miss Patch
Two-Way Stretch (1960) as Mrs Price
Inn for Trouble (1960) as Lily
Carry On Constable (1960) as Distraught Mother
School for Scoundrels (1960) as Mrs Stringer
Doctor in Love (1960) as Professor MacRitchie
Make Mine Mink (1960) as Mme Spolinski
A French Mistress (1960) as Staff Sgt Hodges
No Kidding (1960) as Mrs Spicer
The Pure Hell of St Trinian's (1960) as Miss Harker-Parker
The Night We Got the Bird (1961) as Ma
The Rebel (1961) as Mrs Cravatte
A Weekend with Lulu (1961) as Florence Bell
Double Bunk (1961) as Mrs Harper
Watch It, Sailor! (1961) as Edie Hornett
Nothing Barred (1961) as Elsie
Just for Fun (1963) as Housewife
Heavens Above! (1963) as Rene Smith
You Must Be Joking! (1965) as Elderly Woman
Morgan, a Suitable Case for Treatment (1966) as Mrs Delt
The Wrong Box (1966) as Mrs Hackett
Smashing Time (1967) as Mrs Gimble
The Mini-Affair (1967) as Cook in Chinese Restaurant
Wonderwall (1968) as Mrs Peurofoy
The Italian Job (1969) as Miss Peach
Doctor in Trouble (1970) as Mrs Dailey
On a Clear Day You Can See Forever (1970) as Winnie Wainwhisle
Rookery Nook (1970, TV) as Mrs Leverett
The Private Life of Sherlock Holmes (1970) as Mrs Hudson
For the Love of Ada (1972) as Ada Bingley
Confessions of a Driving Instructor (1976) as Miss Slenderparts
Adventures of a Private Eye (1977) as Miss Friggin
Stand Up, Virgin Soldiers (1977) as Mrs Phillimore
Come Play with Me (1977) as Lady Bovington
The Last Remake of Beau Geste (1977) as Miss Wormwood
The Hound of the Baskervilles (1978) as Mrs Barrymore
The Great Rock & Roll Swindle (1979) as Cinema Usherette
Riding High (1981) as Gran
In Sickness and in Health (1985) as Gwenneth (Series 2–3)
Absolute Beginners (1986) as Mrs Larkin

Bibliography
Thomas, Jane. "Irene Handl", Bete Noir, 4 (Winter, 1987), pp. 102–103.
Thomas, Jane. "Irene Handl: The Last Interview", Bete Noir, 4 (Winter, 1987), pp. 104–116.

References

External links
 
 Performance information in Theatre Archive, University of Bristol
 Biography with photo at Britmovie
 Biography at Leninimports.com

1901 births
1987 deaths
People from Maida Vale
English film actresses
British people of Austrian descent
British people of German descent
English women novelists
Actresses from London
Writers from London
20th-century English actresses
Golders Green Crematorium
20th-century English women writers
20th-century English novelists